Yingbin Road station is an subway station in Changsha, Hunan, China, operated by the Changsha subway operator Changsha Metro.

Station layout
The station has one island platform.

History
The station opened on 29 April 2014. It later became an interchange station after the opening of Line 6.

Surrounding area
Changsha Postal Service

References

Railway stations in Hunan
Railway stations in China opened in 2014